The World on Stage is a Canadian variety television series which aired on CBC Television in 1967.

Premise
This series was produced in Montreal during Expo '67 to feature performances from the various entertainers who visited Montreal. This was produced as separate English and French versions by the respective CBC television networks. Episodes were recorded in colour at Expo's International Broadcasting Centre and included performances of music, theatre and dance.

Scheduling
This half-hour series was broadcast on Wednesdays at 10:30 p.m. (Eastern) from 21 June to 6 September 1967.

References

External links
 

CBC Television original programming
1967 Canadian television series debuts
1967 Canadian television series endings
1960s Canadian variety television series
Ici Radio-Canada Télé original programming